Ayesha Gwilt (born 1989) is an English actress. She trained at the National Youth Theatre and has appeared in several theatre productions since. She also has a role in the BBC television series, All the Small Things as Grace Oudidja. The series also stars Sarah Lancashire, Neil Pearson and Richard Fleeshman. 
She has one sister named Rhian Gwilt (born 1992); both are the daughters of Richard and Joan Gwilt. Recent theatre credits include Seductive Shakespeare at Contact, Manchester; Meet the Mukherjees at The Octagon Theatre, Bolton; and Verbally Challenged at Contact, Manchester.

Gwilt is best known for portraying pupil Amy Porter in series five to seven of the award-winning BBC drama series, Waterloo Road. She left in Series 7, Episode 10.

In 2011, Gwilt began to use the name Nisa Cole.

In October 2016, she appeared as Penelope Betteredge in the BBC mini-series The Moonstone

Filmography

References

External links 

1989 births
Living people
Actresses from Manchester
English television actresses
English stage actresses
British people of Surinamese descent
National Youth Theatre members